University Park is a former census-designated place (CDP) in Miami-Dade County, Florida, United States. It was merged into Westchester CDP for the 2020 U.S. Census. In 2010, the population was 26,995. It encompassed the Modesto A. Maidique Campus of Florida International University.

Description

University Park was the name of the main campus of Florida International University (FIU) (now called the Modesto A. Maidique Campus), located in the area. The campus encompasses . Florida International University was built from around 1965 onwards, with the destruction of Tamiami Airport. At the time, very little was located around FIU, and the campus was referred to as University Park. As Miami grew west, the area came to be known as University Park after the university's campus name.

Today, University Park houses all of the campus's colleges and schools as well as all the administrative offices and main university facilities. University Park is also home to Reagan House (formally known as University House), the home of FIU's president, the Wertheim Performing Arts Center, the Frost Art Museum, the International Hurricane Research Center, and the university's athletic facilities such as Riccardo Silva Stadium, FIU Baseball Stadium, and FIU Arena.

Until the early-1990s, aerial pictures of the campus clearly revealed the features of the airport that used to occupy the land until 1969. Construction has obliterated all of these features, and only the University Tower remains as memory of the university's past. Today, University Park is home to about 87% of the student population and 94% of housing students. University Park is a lush, heavily vegetated campus, with many lakes and nature preserves, as well as an arboretum and has 92 buildings. Current construction at University Park includes an independent art museum for the Frost Art Museum, a Graduate Business School Complex, a Molecular Biology Building, a Student Services Building, a Social Sciences Building, a Medical School Complex, and an expansion to FIU Stadium for a seating capacity of 45,000.

Geography
University Park is located at  (25.745178, -80.366124).

According to the United States Census Bureau, the CDP has a total area of 10.6 km (4.1 mi2). 10.5 km (4.1 mi2) of it is land and 0.1 km (0.04 mi2) of it (0.98%) is water.

Demographics

According to the census of 2000, there were 26,538 people, 8,646 households, and 6,501 families residing in the CDP. The racial makeup of the CDP was 89.04% White (of which 12.5% were non-Hispanic) 3.40% Black, 0.06% Native American, 1.59% Asian, 0.02% Pacific Islander, 3.38% from other races, and 2.51% from two or more races. Hispanic or Latino of any race were 82.69% of the population.

There were 8,646 households, out of which 27.1% had children under the age of 18 living with them, 55.3% were married couples living together, 15.2% had a female householder with no husband present, and 24.8% were non-families. 18.1% of all households were made up of individuals, and 9.4% had someone living alone who was 65 years of age or older. The average household size was 2.96 and the average family size was 3.32.

In the CDP, the population was spread out, with 17.6% under the age of 18, 14.7% from 18 to 24, 25.0% from 25 to 44, 23.7% from 45 to 64, and 19.0% who were 65 years of age or older. The median age was 39 years. For every 100 females, there were 84.3 males. For every 100 females age 18 and over, there were 80.6 males.

The median income for a household in the CDP was $40,039, and the median income for a family was $48,451. Males had a median income of $30,884 versus $25,861 for females. The per capita income for the CDP was $17,249. About 9.8% of families and 14.4% of the population were below the poverty line, including 13.3% of those under age 18 and 15.7% of those age 65 or over.

As of 2000, speakers of Spanish as a first language accounted for 86.45% of residents, while English made up 12.06%, and French as a mother tongue was at 0.45% of the population.

As of 2000, University Park had the fifth highest percentage of Cuban residents in the US, with 59.80% of the populace. It had the twelfth highest percentage of Nicaraguan residents in the US, at 2.89% of the population, and the fifty-fourth highest percentage of Colombian residents in the US, at 2.64% of its population (tied with Allegheny Township, Pennsylvania.)

Education

Colleges and universities
Florida International University Modesto A. Maidique Campus is located in University Park.

Primary and secondary schools
Miami-Dade County Public Schools operates public schools in University Park. Dr. Carlos J. Finlay Elementary School and Olympia Heights Elementary School are in University Park.

St. Agatha Catholic School of the Roman Catholic Archdiocese of Miami is located in University Park.

References

Further reading

External links
Dr. Carlos J. Finlay Elementary School
Olympia Heights Elementary School
St. Agatha Catholic School

Former census-designated places in Florida
1960s establishments in Florida